Yuval Wischnitzer is an Israeli athlete. He won silver and bronze medals in 5000 m in the Asian Games.

At the 1973 Maccabiah Games, he won a gold medal in the 5,000 m.

References

Asian Games medalists in athletics (track and field)
Athletes (track and field) at the 1970 Asian Games
Athletes (track and field) at the 1974 Asian Games
Asian Games silver medalists for Israel
Asian Games bronze medalists for Israel
Maccabiah Games medalists in athletics
Maccabiah Games gold medalists for Israel
Competitors at the 1973 Maccabiah Games
Medalists at the 1970 Asian Games
Medalists at the 1974 Asian Games
Possibly living people
Year of birth missing
Israeli male long-distance runners
20th-century Israeli people